Glutaraldehyde is an organic compound with the formula .  The molecule consists of a five carbon chain doubly terminated with formyl (CHO) groups.  It is usually used as a solution in water, and such solutions exists as a collection of hydrates, cyclic derivatives, and condensation products, several of which interconvert.  Because the molecule has two carbonyl group is reactive to primary amine groups (even as its hydrates), it can function as a crosslinking agent for any substance with primary amine groups and develop imine connected links.  Crosslinking rigidifies and deactivates many biological functions, so in this way, glutaraldehyde solutions are used as biocides and as  fixative.  It is sold under the brandname Cidex and Glutaral. As a disinfectant, it is used to sterilize surgical instruments.

Uses

Biochemistry 
Glutaraldehyde is used in biochemistry applications as an amine-reactive homobifunctional crosslinker and fixative. It kills cells quickly by crosslinking their proteins.  It is usually employed alone or mixed with formaldehyde as the first of two fixative processes to stabilize specimens such as bacteria, plant material, and human cells. A second fixative procedure uses osmium tetroxide to crosslink and stabilize cell and organelle membrane lipids.

Another application for treatment of proteins with glutaraldehyde is the inactivation of bacterial toxins to generate toxoid vaccines, e.g., the pertussis (whooping cough) toxoid component in the Boostrix Tdap vaccine produced by GlaxoSmithKline.

Material Science

In material science glutaraldehyde application areas range from polymers to metals and biomaterials. Glutaraldehyde is commonly used as fixing agent before characterization of biomaterials for microscopy. Glutaraldehyde is a powerful crosslinking agent for many polymers containing primary amine groups.. Glutaraldehdye also can be used for an interlinking agent to improve the adhesion force between two polymeric coatings. Glutaraldehyde is also used to protect against corrosion of undersea pipes.

Medical

Clinical uses

Glutaraldehyde is used as a disinfectant and medication. Usually applied as a solution, it is used to sterilize surgical instruments and other areas.

Dermatological uses 
As a medication it is used to treat plantar warts. For this purpose, a 10% w/v solution is used. It dries the skin, facilitating physical removal of the wart.

Glutaraldehyde is also used in the treatment of hyperhidrosis under the control of dermatologists. In people who have frequent sweating but do not respond to aluminum chloride. Glutaraldehyde solution is an effective agent to treat palmar and plantar hyperhidrosis as an alternative to tannic acid and formaldehyde.

Safety
Side effects include skin irritation. If exposed to large amounts, nausea, headache, and shortness of breath may occur. Protective equipment is recommended when used, especially in high concentrations. Glutaraldehyde is effective against a range of microorganisms including spores. Glutaraldehyde is a dialdehyde. It works by a number of mechanisms.

As a strong sterilant, glutaraldehyde is toxic and a strong irritant. There is no strong evidence of carcinogenic activity, However, some occupations that work with this chemical have an increased risk of some cancers.

Production and reactions

Production
Glutaraldehyde is produced industrially by the catalytic oxidation of cyclopentene by hydrogen peroxide, which can be achieved in the presence of various tungstic acid-based heteropoly acid catalysts. This reaction essentially mimics ozonolysis.  Alternatively it can be made by the Diels-Alder reaction of acrolein and vinyl ethers followed by hydrolysis.

Reactions
Like other dialdehydes, (e.g., glyoxal) and simple aldehydes (e.g., formaldehyde), glutaraldehyde hydrates in aqueous solution, forming gem-diols.  These diols in turn equilibrate with cyclic hemiacetal. Monomeric glutaraldehyde polymerizes by aldol condensation and Michael reactions yielding alpha, beta-unsaturated poly-glutaraldehyde and related oligomers. This reaction occurs at alkaline pH values.

A number of mechanisms have been invoked to explain the biocidal and fixative properties of glutaraldehyde. Like many other aldehydes, it reacts with primary amines and thiol groups, which are common functional groups in proteins, nucleic acids and polymeric materials. Being bi-functional, glutaraldehyde is a crosslinker, which rigidifies macromolecular structures and shuts down their reactivity.

The aldehyde groups in glutaraldehyde are susceptible to formation of imines by reaction with the amines of lysine and nucleic acids.  The derivatives from aldol condensation of pairs of glutaraldehyde also undergo imine formation.

Use in the Aquarium Hobby  
Glutaraldehyde diluted with water is often sold as alternative to carbon dioxide gas injection for aquarium plants.  It is commonly also used by aquarists in low doses as an algaecide.

References

External links 
 
  Glutaraldehyde: Sources of emissions AU National Pollutant Inventory
 Glutaraldehyde US National Institute for Occupational Safety and Health
 Glutaraldehyde NIST Standard Reference Data

Aldehydes
Anatomical preservation
Disinfectants
World Health Organization essential medicines
Wikipedia medicine articles ready to translate